Harry Abraham Weaver (February 26, 1892 -  May 30, 1983), was a professional baseball player who played pitcher in the Major Leagues from 1915 to 1919. He played for the Chicago Cubs and Philadelphia Athletics. In 1918 Weaver's career was interrupted while he served in World War I.

References

External links

1892 births
1983 deaths
Major League Baseball pitchers
Chicago Cubs players
Philadelphia Athletics players
Oakland Oaks (baseball) players
Kansas City Blues (baseball) players
Indianapolis Indians players
Galveston Sand Crabs players
Nashville Vols players